Autumn Flow is the debut studio album of Australian singer-songwriter Lior. The album was released in October 2004 and peaked at number 45 on the ARIA charts, early in 2005 and was certified gold in 2006.
 
At the J Award of 2005, the album was nominated for Australian Album of the Year.

At the ARIA Music Awards of 2005, the album was nominated for three awards; Breakthrough Artist, Best Male Artist, and Best Independent Release.

In June 2015, the album was re-released in celebration of its 10th anniversary, with 7 bonus tracks. About the re-release, Lior said "It wasn't actually my idea, a few people mentioned it to me and I was thinking no, I have to do this other thing. Then I stopped and realised it had been a pretty special 10 years and it was important to stop, reflect and celebrate, so I think it was a good opportunity to do that." Lior said "There's a beautiful innocence around the album and it still speaks to me in that way and I still very much connect to it."

Reception
JB HiFi reviewer said "Lior's sound is a rootsy mix of styles that always harks back to the lyric and melody. The album itself is grounded in the late 60s / early 70s songwriter era, however the arrangements and production approach are quite contemporary. Artists such as Joni Mitchell, Paul Simon, Nick Drake and Rufus Wainwright are called to mind. It is Lior's voice that has drawn most attention, capable of both power and tenderness, always delivered with soul in its truest sense."

Track listing
 all tracks written by Lior, except track 4 (Lior and François Tétaz) and track 10 (Lior, Brett Hirst and Michael Iverson).

"This Old Love" – 3:04
"Daniel" – 3:50
"Gypsy Girl" – 3:10
"Superficial" – 3:52
"Autumn Flow" – 4:13
"Bedouin Song" – 3:09
"Sitting With a Stranger" – 3:15
"The Art of Cruelty" – 3:35
"Blessed" – 3:13
"Stuck In a War" – 3:18
"Building Ships" – 4:46
"Grey Ocean" – 3:36

2015 10th Anniversary Edition bonus disc
 "Bedouin Song" (Demo) – 3:04		
 "Autumn Flow" (Demo) – 3:11		
 "The Art of Cruelty" (Demo) – 4:08		
 "Grey Ocean – 3:50		
 "Landslide" – 4:15		
 "Forro" – 3:39		
 "Satisfied Mind" – 3:48

Charts

Certifications

Release history

References

2004 debut albums
Lior albums